Three Kids and a Queen is a 1935 American drama film directed by Edward Ludwig, written by Samuel Ornitz and Barry Trivers, and starring May Robson, Henry Armetta, Herman Bing, Frankie Darro, Bill Burrud and William "Billy" Benedict. It was released on October 21, 1935, by Universal Pictures.

Plot

Cast  
May Robson as Mary Jane 'Queenie' Baxter
Henry Armetta as Tony Orsatti
Herman Bing as Walter Merkin
Frankie Darro as Blackie
Bill Burrud as Doc 
William "Billy" Benedict as Flash
Lawrence Grant as Wilfred Edgar 
Charlotte Henry as Julia Orsatti
Lillian Harmer as Elmira Wiggins
Henry Kolker as Crippets
John Miljan as Boss Benton
Hale Hamilton as Ralph
Noel Madison as Stanley
Tom Dugan as Bill
Irving Pichel as Kraft
Hedda Hopper as Mrs. Cummings
Ferdinand Gottschalk as Dr. Flesig
Edward Van Sloan as Dr. Gordon
Louis Vincenot as Dr. Charcot
Arnold Korff as Dr. Winters
Adrian Morris as Federal Man

References

External links
 

1935 films
1930s English-language films
American drama films
1935 drama films
Universal Pictures films
Films directed by Edward Ludwig
American black-and-white films
1930s American films